Paul Lannoye (22 June 1939 – 4 December 2021) was a Belgian politician. He was one of the founding members of the Ecolo party and a Member of the European Parliament from 1989 to 2004. Lannoye died on 4 December 2021, at the age of 82.

References 

1939 births
2021 deaths
Ecolo MEPs
MEPs for Belgium 1989–1994
MEPs for Belgium 1994–1999
MEPs for Belgium 1999–2004
People from Sprimont